, stylized as ZËIЯAM (originally marketed in English as Zeram), is a 1991 Japanese science fiction film directed by Keita Amemiya. The film stars Yūko Moriyama as an alien bounty hunter named Iria, who comes to Earth to do battle with Zeiram, an immortal alien creature. With the help of her AI partner Bob and two ordinary Japanese electricians, she fights Zeiram in an artificial dimension called "the Zone". 

In 1994, the film was followed by an original video animation (OVA) anime series known as Iria: Zeiram the Animation (a prequel to the film) as well as a 1994 sequel film titled Zeiram 2.

Plot
Bounty hunters Iria and Bob accept a job to apprehend Zeiram on Earth, setting up an alternate dimension called a Zone to help combat and capture him. Iria and Bob's use of stolen electricity results in electric company employees Kamiya and Teppei investigating their base just as Zeiram enters Earth's atmosphere.

Kamiya accidentally flips a switch that transports Teppei into the Zone. While Kamiya unsuccessfully tries to get an explanation from Iria, she transports the two of them to the Zone. Upon arrival, she traps him and leaves to destroy the pod Zeiram arrived in. Teppei finds Zeiram and gets chased by another monster that the creature summoned, eventually stumbling across Kamiya. Iria's first attempt to capture Zeiram fails and she finds he has a shield that makes him immune to bullet fire.

Iria decides to use her special combat suit, despite Bob's protests to not fight him in close-range combat. After Iria finally manages to capture Zeiram, Teppei comes across her. He asks her to free Kamiya, which she reluctantly agrees to. Zeiram causes a distraction while trapped, using one of his monsters to lure Iria back to Earth. The ensuing fight damages the teleportation unit. Teppei saves Kamiya from a sneak attack by the monster Zeiram summoned, but Kamiya accidentally shoots the lock to Zeiram's prison, freeing the creature.

Iria tries teleporting back to the Zone but is set back by a power failure. Teppei and Kamiya hotwire a car, using it to incapacitate Zeiram. The human-like face on Zeiram's "hat" attacks them, biting Kamiya. Teppei and Kamiya escape soon after. Bob speculates that Zeiram is a forbidden biological weapon whose "hat" is used to eat other beings and use what he has consumed to produce his monster subordinates. Zeiram's attempt to make a subordinate copy of Kamiya ends in failure and he kills it in anger.

After a brief break to address Kamiya's wounds, Teppei receives a communicator from Iria. She explains the problems with the transporter and that the Zone itself will not last for much longer. They agree upon Teppei and Kamiya waiting it out as long as they can until Iria can get back to the Zone. Iria and Bob decide to bring a powerful weapon called the Metis Cannon to fight Zeiram, despite the personal risk it causes them to use it without prior approval. Kamiya hijacks construction equipment to save Teppei from Zeiram before Iria returns to shoot Zeiram with a bazooka.

Zeiram soon recovers, shedding his skin to take on a giant skeletal form. Iria defends Teppei and Kamiya as they retrieve the Metis cannon from the spot Bob transported it to. Iria traps the "hat" with eight minutes to spare before the Zone breaks down. Kamiya and Iria are teleported to the base, meeting Bob. Bob asks Teppei to pick up the captured Zeiram, who hovers in his restraints and destroys the transport unit needed to bring Iria back. He escapes from the trap and regenerates his body. Kamiya uses his technician skills to help repair the transport unit while Zeiram ramps up his attack. Kamiya succeeds and Iria returns in time to save the two men and Bob from Zeiram. After a brief respite, Iria complements the two on their resilience and offers them two of her braids as a "thank you" gesture. Bob takes a photo of the trio together as a memento.

In Zeiram 2, the creature's core, which was presumed dead, is recovered by a shadowy organization which installs it as the organic core of a robotic supersoldier. Iria, Bob, Teppei, and Kamiya continue their battle against Zeiram in a Zone created by the monster. The plot plays out similarly to the original Zeiram, with the four getting into cat-and-mouse confrontations with the creature and the monsters that he summons and dealing with complications caused by Iria and Bob's faulty tech. The sequel adds the additional challenge of Fujikuro, a manipulative rival and saboteur who seeks the same ancient teleportation relic called the Kamarite that Iria and Bob returned to Earth to get. Fujikuro also appeared in Iria: Zeiram the Animation.

Production 
The film was the second film directed by Keita Amemiya with his first being Mirai Ninja.

Release
Zeiram was released in Japan in August 1991. The film was released in the United States by Fox Lorber with an English dub by Streamline Pictures in May 1994 with the title Zeram. In 1994, a sequel to Zeiram titled Zeiram 2 was released in Japan on December 17, 1994.

The English-dubbed Zeram was released on DVD in the United States by Image Entertainment in 1998 and with both Japanese and English soundtracks as Zeiram by Tokyo Shock in 2006.

Cast

English dubbing staff
Voice Production: Streamline Pictures
Voice Director: Carl Macek
Script: Steve Kramer
Additional Dialogue: Carl Macek
Recording Engineer: David Walsh, Deb Adair
Final Mix: Ernie Sheesley
Production Manager: Scott Narrie
Recording Studio: Screenmusic Studios

Reception 
The film received mixed reviews by American film reviewers. Russell Smith in the Austin American-Statesman gave the film just two stars, praising the opening but overall saying the film was lacking. Likewise, Newsday reviewer Terry Kelleher gave the film also two stars. Fangoria magazine was highly critical of the English dubbing in the film. However, LA Weekly praised the film's direction, action.

References

Footnotes

Sources

External links

 

1991 films
1990s science fiction action films
Japanese science fiction action films
Tokusatsu films
Films about extraterrestrial life
1990s Japanese films